William Dunbar  (1852 (or 1853) – 1874) was a Gateshead songwriting collier who died at the age of 21.

Life
William Dunbar was born in 1852 (or 1853) at Wardley Colliery, near Gateshead.
 
He started work as an apprentice to a Mr Romanis, a Gateshead painter and glazier, but had a restless nature and in a very short time changed trade to work as a cartwright or wainwright, working in Felling and then, for the rest of his short life, as a coal miner working in the coal pits.

Even here he was restless and took to various forms of art to break the monotony. He was already writing songs, many very humorous and topical, and added singing to his repertoire. He took to appearing in various local concerts, and although not a very good singer, his performance and his materials were always appreciated by the audience.

He was also a talented artist, and using water colours and pencil, produced some more than acceptable works of art, but none appear to have survived.

But song writing became his first love. He wrote numerous songs which appeared in John W Chater's "Keelmin's comic annewal", entered many into the various competitions run by John W Chater and others, winning many prizes and medals. He also produced a book of over 40 pages (published by Stevenson and Dryden of Newcastle) containing his own songs, mostly songs which had been previously included in John W Chater's books, periodicals and chapbooks and which appeared in print in 1874, after his death.

His output was prolific, as though he had a premonition of his early death. He died on 23 February 1874 at age 21. After his death many tributes appeared in several of John W Chater's publications.

Works 
These include :-
 Best way to feel for a man, sung to the tune of 'Wait for the turn of the tide'. It is a Motto Song (i.e. a song with suggestive expression of a guiding principle; a maxim) moralising and giving advice on how men should take care of those less fortunate.
 Billy Baker, sung to the tune of “The Handsome Page”. It is a Comic song about a local fictional character.
 Comic medley, sung to the tune of “Who's for the bus”. It is a Comic song about a local fictional character
 Deeth o' Jimmy Renforth, sung to the tune of “Castles in the air”. It is a song about the death of famous local rower Jimmy Renforth
 Doing all things for the best, sung to the tune of “Take care of the peace”. It is a Motto Song stressing the importance of being fair to others, with a few religious undertones
 Don't take offence, sung to the tune of “Act on the square”. It is a Motto Song saying don't take offence and laugh at yourself gracefully
  Forester's song, sung to the tune of “Oxford Joe”. It is a song written specifically for a concert for the Ancient Order of Foresters at Wrekenton in 1872
  Geordy's pay, sung to the tune of “Barbara Bell”. It is a song discussing wages and expenses
  If ivvor aw cease te speak, sung to the tune of “If I ever cease to love”. It is a song parodying If I ever cease to love 
 Imitation, sung to the tune of “Just to show there's no ill feeling”. It is a Motto Song expressing the dangers of imitation
  Joe the barber's boy, sung to the tune of “Imensicoff”. It is a comic song about a barber’s apprentice
  Joseph Arch, sung to the tune of “The Marble Arch”. It is a  song about Joseph Arch, on the president of the newly founded National Agricultural Labourers' Union
  Maw bonny Bess. (or A dog fancier's musings) is a  song about his racing dog
  My A B C (or items alphabetically arranged), sung to the tune of “Bow, Wow,Wow”. It is a comic song about a barber’s apprentice
  North Durham election, 1874. A dialogue between Tommy Stobbs and Sally  is a comic song about a husband and wife’s different opinions of the candidates
  Nothing venture, nothing win, sung to the tune of “Par excellence”. It is a comic song about a barber’s apprentice
  Nowt se Queer as Foaks, sung to the tune of “Castles in the Air”. It is a comic song in dialect about ordinary “Foalks
  Playing the troon, sung to the tune of “A t'yel wiv a seekwil, an' monny an eekwil”. It is a comic song in dialect about wishing he'd attended school regularly
  Pull that wins the day, sung to the tune of “Pull, pull together, boys”. It is a Motto song telling of the importance in sticking together
  Robin Ramsay; or, what aw'm puzzled wi', sung to the tune of “The whole hog or none”. It is a comic song in the Geordie dialect
  She greets me wiv a smile, sung to the tune of “I am so volatile”. It is a comic song about family life
  The shiftin’ is a comic song about pretending to move house to escape the debt collector
  The Wardley Band, sung to the tune of “The pawnshop bleezin”. It is a song specially written for a concert in aid of the Wardley Brass Band, held on 31 January 1874 (less than a month before William Dunbar died)
  We hevvent lang te be sober noo, sung to the tune of “I wish I was a fish”. It is a comic song about the impending arrival of pay day
  The Wellesley lads, sung to the tune of “Imminsicoff”. It is a song in praise of one of the first schools set up to train sailors, at Wellesley on Tyneside in 1868
  We're seldom what we shud be, sung to the tune of “The country cousin”. It is a song originally printed in John W Chater's Diary and Local Remembrancer
  Woman charmin' woman O, sung to the tune of “Try, try again”. It is a song originally printed in John W Chater's Diary and Local Remembrancer
  Would you like to see, sung to the tune of “Down among the coals”. It is a song originally printed in John W Chater's Diary and Local Remembrancer

See also 
Geordie dialect words
Dunbar's local songs and recitations 1874
Thomas Allan
Allan's Illustrated Edition of Tyneside Songs and Readings
John W Chater
Chater's Canny Newcassel Diary and Remembrancer 1872

References

External links
 FARNE archive – enter Dunbar William
 Wardley Colliery
 Allan’s Illustrated Edition of Tyneside songs and readings

English singers
English songwriters
People from Newcastle upon Tyne (district)
Musicians from Tyne and Wear
1874 deaths
1853 births
Geordie songwriters
19th-century English musicians
19th-century English singers